Blue Spring is a 1959 album by jazz trumpeter Kenny Dorham and saxophonist Cannonball Adderley released on the Riverside label, featuring performances by Dorham and Adderley with Dave Amram, Cecil Payne, Cedar Walton, Paul Chambers, and Philly Joe Jones or Jimmy Cobb.

Reception
The AllMusic review by Stephen Cook awarded the album 4 stars and states: "listeners new to the work of Kenny Dorham should definitely consider this somewhat overlooked Riverside date from 1959. The set features plenty of Dorham's varied and sophisticated horn work and four of his top-drawer originals.... Essential listening for Dorham fans." The Penguin Guide to Jazz awarded the album 3 stars, stating: "Dorham enjoyed a brief resurgence towards the end of the '50s".

Track listing 
All compositions by Kenny Dorham except as indicated

 "Blue Spring" - 7:42
 "It Might as Well Be Spring" (Oscar Hammerstein II, Richard Rodgers) - 7:42
 "Poetic Spring" - 6:47
 "Spring Is Here" (Lorenz Hart, Rodgers) - 6:39
 "Spring Cannon" - 4:53
 "Passion Spring" - 8:30

Personnel 
 Kenny Dorham - trumpet
 Cannonball Adderley - alto saxophone
 David Amram - French horn
 Cecil Payne - baritone saxophone
 Cedar Walton - piano
 Paul Chambers - bass
 Jimmy Cobb - drums (tracks 1-4)
 Philly Joe Jones - drums (5-6)

References 

1959 albums
Riverside Records albums
Cannonball Adderley albums
Kenny Dorham albums
Albums produced by Orrin Keepnews